Didenheim (Alsatian: Didena) is a former commune in the Haut-Rhin department in north-eastern France. On 1 January 2016, it was merged into the new commune Brunstatt-Didenheim. It forms part of the Mulhouse Alsace Agglomération, the inter-communal local government body for the Mulhouse conurbation.

See also
 Communes of the Haut-Rhin department

References

Former communes of Haut-Rhin